Consumer import of prescription drugs refers to an individual person, typically a patient, getting prescription drugs from a foreign country for their own personal use in their own country.

Import mechanisms
People can have drugs shipped to them from online pharmacies. They may travel internationally for the purpose of medical tourism, and purchase drugs there to be used back home.

Causes
Individual consumers will only consider seeking drugs from other countries if they have some barrier to access in their own country. One barrier to access is high local prices compared to other markets. Another barrier to access could be legal restrictions preventing an individual from getting a drug they want or need.

International drug market prices
In some markets, drug prices are set or influenced by the prices in other, nearby markets. In Europe, for example, people freely and easily travel to different countries, and the price of a certain drug in one country affects the price in other, nearby countries. Having this kind of competitive exchange can keep prices low, but it can also lead to lowered drug accessibility. Sometimes a manufacturer may choose not to offer a drug in one market, to ensure success in selling the drug at a higher price in a different market.

Businesses, manufacturers and drug retailers wish to control the supply of pharmaceuticals in their own marketplace. As such, if low-cost drugs entered a market from other lower-cost territories, what might develop is pure price-based selling. The TRIPS agreement is an example of a World Trade Organization treaty which regulates how drugs can be traded in the international marketplace.

Some developing countries might receive access to lower-cost drugs through compulsory licenses. Compulsory licenses affect markets outside the country in which they are issued.

Variation in legality
Drugs which are legal in one place may not be legal in another.

By region

Canada to United States
People in the United States have easy access to Canada. The quality of medicine in Canada is comparable to that of the United States. Drug prices are often much lower in Canada than in the United States. To save money, some consumers in the United States seek to purchase drugs in Canada. Different people have published different perspectives on this practice.

One major on-line supplier, Canada Drugs, announced its closure on July 13, 2018, as part of an agreement with the U.S. Department of Justice.

Two organizations, the Canadian International Pharmacy Association and the PharmacyChecker Verification Program, verify the safety and legitimacy of online pharmacies that ship from Canada to the United States.

Mexico to United States

In some cases, U.S. insurance companies will pay consumers of high-cost drugs to personally travel to Mexico to buy the same drugs at a much lower cost there.

Society and culture

Petition for government reform
Consumers may feel that prescription drugs which are available to multiple countries to be of equivalent quality, and feel comfortable buying and using drugs by choosing to purchase from the country which offers the drugs at the lowest price.

Legal status
Governments typically oversee the import of prescription drugs so bringing a prescription drug from a foreign country could be Illegal drug trade.

See also
List of pharmacies by country

References

Drug pricing
Medical tourism
Social problems in medicine